Albert Olsson may refer to:
 Albert Olsson (writer), Swedish writer and teacher
 Albert Olsson (footballer), Swedish footballer
 Albert Julius Olsson, British maritime artist